Aniyaa is a 2014 Maldivian family drama film directed by Ahmed Nimal. Co-produced by Nims Films and Fariva Films, the film stars Mohamed Jumayyil, Niuma Mohamed and Ismail Rasheed in pivotal roles. The film was released on 28 March 2014. The story of the film revolves around a boy who has been deprived of love from his parents.

Cast 
 Mohamed Jumayyil as Anil
 Niuma Mohamed as Mizna
 Ismail Rasheed as Latheef
 Fathimath Fareela as Zilma
 Mariyam Haleem as Nazeeha
 Ali Farooq as Areef
 Neena Saleem
 Hamdhoon Farooq as Zaheen
 Ismail Ziya as Rippe
 Mariyam Shahuza as Areef's mistress

Development
In May 2013, it was announced that Ahmed Nimal decided to launch his son, Mohamed Jumayyil's career with the film Aniyaa, alongside a star cast of Niuma Mohamed, Ismail Rasheed and Fathimath Fareela. It was initially slated to release on 26 September 2016. However, due to delayed post-production it was later pushed to an early November 2013 release, before finalising to release the film on 28 March 2014.

Soundtrack

Release and response
The film was released on 28 March 2014. Producers were able to screen limited shows of the film due to the technical errors caused within the cinema, forcing abrupt interruptions in screening further shows. Due to this struggle, it failed to garner enough hype to the film.

Accolades

References

2014 films
2014 drama films
Maldivian drama films
Films directed by Ahmed Nimal
Dhivehi-language films